CS Universitatea Cluj-Napoca is a professional women's basketball team from Cluj-Napoca, Romania. The club plays in the  Liga Națională.

History
CS Universitatea Cluj-Napoca is the oldest and the most successful Liga Națională team. Founded in 1947, in Cluj-Napoca, the club won not less than 14 Romanian Leagues, between 1953 and 1993. In the 80's they won the league in almost every year except 1980 and 1983 when the league was won by 2 teams from Bucharest, Politehnica and Voința. After 13 years of domination U Cluj entered in a regress period and have not won any trophy from 1993, but still remain the team with the most Leagues won in Romanian women's basketball.

Honours
 Liga Națională
Winners (14): 1952–53, 1953–54, 1980–81, 1981–82, 1983–84, 1984–85, 1985–86, 1986–87, 1987–88, 1988–89, 1989–90, 1990–91, 1991–92, 1992–93,

Current roster

References

External links
 frbaschet.ro 

Sport in Cluj County
Sport in Cluj-Napoca
Basketball teams in Romania
Women's basketball teams in Romania
Basketball teams established in 1947
1947 establishments in Romania